CopperLicht is an open-source JavaScript library for creating games and interactive 3D applications using WebGL, developed by Ambiera. The aim of the library is to provide an API for making it easier developing 3D content for the web. It is supposed to be used together with its commercial 3D world editor CopperCube, but it can also be used without.

History
In February 2010, Ambiera introduced CopperLicht  and showcased it by providing a demo website, showing a Quake III Arena level rendered in real time in the browser window. The library was originally intended to be used as a WebGL backend for the CopperCube editor, but then the developers decided to make the library free to be used by the public. In November 2014, CopperLicht was made free and open source, based on a zlib style license.

Features
CopperLicht includes the following features:
 3D rendering based on a hierarchical scene graph
 Pre-created materials and shaders, including pre-calculated lightmap support
 Skeletal animation
 Built-in collision detection and simple Physics engine
 Dynamic light support
 System to create and use custom shaders and materials based on the OpenGL Shading Language (GLSL)
 Impostors like Billboards and Skyboxes
 Paths and Splines
 Behavior and Action system
 Texture animation
 Vertex color support
 Integrated 2D font and 2D primitives rendering system
 Automatic redraw reduction system

See also
 List of WebGL frameworks
 WebGL
 Canvas element
 CopperCube

References

3D scenegraph APIs
Cross-platform software
Free 3D graphics software
Graphics libraries
JavaScript libraries
WebGL